Senga may be:
Nsenga language
Tumbuka-Senga language